Synchronized swimming competitions at the 2015 Pan American Games in Toronto was held from July 9 to 11 at the Toronto Pan Am Sports Centre (CIBC Pan Am/Parapan Am Aquatics Centre and Field House). Due to naming rights the arena will be known as the latter for the duration of the games. The competition was split into two events a duet event and team competition (open only to women). Due to Pan American Games being scheduled to be held roughly around the same time as the 2015 World Aquatics Championships scheduled for Kazan, Russia, the synchronized swimming events began the day before the opening ceremony (when events are traditionally not held until after the ceremony).

The highest placing duet (not already qualified) qualified for the 2016 Summer Olympics in Rio de Janeiro, Brazil.

Competition schedule

The following is the competition schedule for the synchronized swimming competitions:

Medal table

Medalists

Participating nations
A total of 13 countries have qualified athletes. The number of athletes a nation has entered is in parentheses beside the name of the country.

Qualification

A total of 80 synchronized swimmers qualified to compete at the games. 8 teams of nine athletes (including one reserve) along with an additional four duets qualified to compete at the games. The host nation is automatically qualified with a team of nine athletes. A NOC may enter a maximum of nine athletes, if it has qualified a team and two athletes if it has qualified only a duet.

See also
Synchronized swimming at the 2016 Summer Olympics

References

 
Events at the 2015 Pan American Games
Pan American Games
2015